Stade Moulay Hassan (Stade Prince Héritier Moulay El Hassan) is a stadium located in Rabat, Morocco.

The stadium was renovated in 2012. It is the home venue of Fath Union Sport.

References

Football venues in Morocco
Fath Union Sport
Buildings and structures in Rabat